Mohamed Nouri Jouini  (born 13 October 1961 in Tunis) is a Tunisian politician.

Biography
He lived in Oregon and returned to Tunisia when former President Zine El Abidine Ben Ali came to power in 1987. He sits on the board of governors of the Arab Bank for Economic Development in Africa.

He received his Ph.D. in Decision Sciences from the University of Oregon and is a former director of the Sousse (Tunisia) Higher Institute of Management. He has also served on the faculty at the University of Tunis.

He is Minister of Planning and International Cooperation between September 2002 and February 2011.

Honours
 2002 : Officier of the Order of the Republic of Tunisia
 2009 : Grand Cross of the Order of the Seventh of November (Tunisia)
 2019 : 2nd Class of the Order of the Rising Sun (Japan)

References

Government ministers of Tunisia
University of Oregon alumni
Living people
Year of birth missing (living people)